Józef Siemieński (born 2 March 1882 in Skrzydłów near Radomsko – 14 October 1941 in Auschwitz) was a Polish archivist, historian of law.

Siemieński was from 1925 until 1939 director of the Central Archives of Historical Records (AGAD) in Warsaw and professor at the Jagiellonian University since 1938.

He was arrested by the Gestapo and murdered in the German concentration camp Auschwitz.

Works
 Ustrój Rzeczypospolitej Polskiej (1915)
 Polska kultura polityczna wieku XVI w. (Kultura staropolska) (1932)
 Polskie zbiory rêkopiœmienne przed wojna, podczas wojny i po wojnie (1941)

1882 births
1941 deaths
Polish people who died in Auschwitz concentration camp
Academic staff of Jagiellonian University
20th-century Polish historians
Polish male non-fiction writers
Polish civilians killed in World War II
People from Radomsko County